Radishchevskoye Urban Settlement is the name of several municipal formations in Russia.

Radishchevskoye Urban Settlement, a municipal formation which the work settlement of Radishchev in Nizhneilimsky District of Irkutsk Oblast is incorporated as
Radishchevskoye Urban Settlement, a municipal formation which Radishchevsky Settlement Okrug in Radishchevsky District of Ulyanovsk Oblast is incorporated as

See also
Radishchevsky (disambiguation)

References

Notes

Sources

